Cycling competitions at the 2023 Pan American Games in Santiago, Chile will be held at five venues across Santiago. The BMX racing competitions will be held in the BMX Track in Peñalolén, while the Esplanade of urban sports will feature freestyle BMX events. 
San Cristobal Metropolitan Park will stage the mountain biking competitions, and the Streets of Isla de Maipo and Santiago will stage the road competitions. Finally the velodrome will stage the track cycling competitions.

22 medal events will contested, four in BMX, two in mountain biking and four in road cycling and 12 in track cycling. Each discipline is. gender neutral in terms of events. A total of 250 cyclists qualified to compete at the games.

Qualification

A total of 283 cyclists (142 men and 141 women) will qualify to compete. 187 will qualify in road/track, 36 in mountain biking and 60 in BMX. Various events and rankings were used to determine the qualifiers. A nation could enter a maximum of 34 athletes, four in mountain biking (two per gender), six in BMX (three per gender) 18 in track (nine per gender) and six in road (three per gender). Chile as host nation, was automatically awarded the maximum quota of 34 spots.

Medal summary

Medalists
BMX

BMX freestyle

Mountain biking

Road cycling

Track cycling

See also
Cycling at the 2024 Summer Olympics

References

Events at the 2023 Pan American Games
Pan American Games
Pan American Games
Pan American Games
2023
2023 in mountain biking
2023 in BMX